Khagrachhari Hill District Council is the local government council responsible for the administration of Khagrachhari District, Bangladesh. The chairman of the council is Kongjari Chowdhury.

History
On 6 March 1989 the Khagrachari Local Government council was established to look after the welfare of the tribal and ethnic minorities in the District. In the Chittagong Hill Tracts (Rangamati District, Bandarban District, and Khagrachhari District) there was low level conflict between the government of Bangladesh and Parbattya Chattagram Jana Sanghati Samiti, which represented the tribal communities. On 2 December 1997 the government of Bangladesh and the Parbattya Chattagram Jana Sanghati Samiti signed a peace treaty ending the conflict. After the treaty was signed, steps were taken by the government to strengthen the council as required by the treaty. The council was renamed to Khagrachhari Hill District Council. Since the peace treaty was signed the council built 40 schools and renovated 100 schools.

Previous Chairman

References

1989 establishments in Bangladesh
Khagrachhari District
Local government in Bangladesh